Tunahan Cicek (born 12 May 1992) is a Swiss professional footballer who currently plays for FC Vaduz as a forward.

Career

Vaduz
On 15 May 2019 FC Vaduz confirmed, that Cicek had joined the club on a 3-year contract.

Personal life
Born in Switzerland, Cicek is of Turkish descent.

References

External links

1992 births
Living people
Swiss people of Turkish descent
Swiss men's footballers
Association football midfielders
FC St. Gallen players
FC Winterthur players
Boluspor footballers
FC Schaffhausen players
Neuchâtel Xamax FCS players
FC Vaduz players
Swiss expatriate footballers
Swiss expatriate sportspeople in Liechtenstein
Expatriate footballers in Liechtenstein
Swiss Super League players
Swiss Challenge League players
TFF First League players
People from Arbon
Sportspeople from Thurgau